Thomas Munkholt Hansen (born 25 March 1976) is a Danish cricketer. Hansen is a right-handed batsman who bowls left-arm fast-medium. In 1997, Hansen became the third Dane, after Ole Mortensen and Soren Henriksen, to play English county cricket when he joined Hampshire. His first-class career with Hampshire was brief, playing just four matches in three seasons. After leaving Hampshire, Hansen established himself as a regular in the Danish team, representing it in the ICC Trophy and List A cricket, until 2009.

Early career
Hansen was born at Glostrup, Region Hovedstaden. He first played cricket when he was nine years old, following his father, who played for Denmark, into the sport.
A previous Denmark Under-19 captain, Hansen made his international debut for Denmark against Malaysia in the 1997 ICC Trophy. Making five appearances in that tournament, he took a total of 10 wickets at an average of 14.30, with best figures of 5/51. His performances for Denmark caught the attention of Hampshire, with Hansen joining the English county for the 1997 season. It was during this season that he made his first-class debut for the county against Worcestershire in Hampshire's final match in that seasons County Championship, becoming the first Dane to represent Hampshire. He went wicketless in the match, while with the bat he recorded scores of 12 not out and 19.

Having spent most of the 1997 season in the Hampshire Second XI, this again was the case for the 1998 season, with Hansen not featuring in any of Hampshire's first-class matches that season. He featured heavily for the Second XI in the 1999 season, but did make three first-class appearances in the 1999 County Championship against Sussex, Northamptonshire and Somerset. He took a total of 5 wickets in these three matches, which came at an average of 39.20, with best figures of 3/59. His career first-class bowling average ended at 54.20, while with the bat he scored a total of 64 runs at a batting average of 12.80, with a high score of 24. He left Hampshire at the end of the 1999 season, and despite playing second XI cricket for Leicestershire and Northamptonshire in 2000, he was unable to secure any further contracts in county cricket.

It was in 2000 that he made his debut in List A cricket for Denmark against Zimbabwe A in the 2000 ICC Emerging Nations Tournament. Hansen made five appearances in that tournament, which was hosted in Zimbabwe. He took 9 wickets at an average of 14.11, with best figures of 3/20. Later that same year, he appeared for Denmark in a List A match in the English domestic one-day tournament, against the Durham Cricket Board at Park Drive, Hartlepool. Hansen scored 15 runs in the Danish innings, before being dismissed by Marcus North, while with the ball he took the wickets of Stephen Ball and Steven Chapman, finishing with figures of 2/32 in what was a Danish loss. He featured in the 2001 ICC Trophy in Canada, making eight appearances. He took 11 wickets in the tournament, at an average of 13.81 and with best figures of 3/11.

Later career
His next major appearance for Denmark came in English domestic cricket in the 2003 Cheltenham & Gloucester Trophy against the Leicestershire Cricket Board, though the match which was a first round fixture was played in August 2002 to avoid fixture congestion the following season. Denmark lost the match by 4 wickets. The following season, he appeared for Denmark in the first round of the 2004 Cheltenham & Gloucester Trophy against Wales Minor Counties, with the match itself played late in the 2003 season in a similar arrangement to that already mentioned. Denmark again lost the match. Hansen played in his third and final ICC Trophy during the 2005 ICC Trophy in Ireland. In a change from previous tournaments, this ICC Trophy held List A status. He made six appearances during the tournament, with him taking 15 wickets at an average of 14.00, with best figures of 6/30. These figures, which came against Uganda, were his maiden List A five wicket haul. Hansen also scored 75 runs in the tournament, including recording what remains his only half century, scoring 51 against Bermuda. In total, he represented Denmark in 19 ICC Trophy matches, taking 36 wickets at an average of 14.02.

In August 2007, he took 7/13 in a friendly against Bermuda at Svanholm Park, Brøndby, the best bowling figures for Denmark in international cricket. In November of that year, he was selected in Denmark's squad for the World Cricket League Division Two in Namibia. The matches in this competition held List A status, with Hansen playing in all six of Denmark's matches in the tournament, helping them secure fourth place and with it a place in the 2009 World Cup Qualifier. Hansen had a quiet tournament, taking 5 wickets at an average of 34.40, with best figures of 2/27. He was later selected for Denmark's squad for the World Cup Qualifier in 2009. Hansen injured his hand during the tournament and only played in three matches against Afghanistan, the Netherlands and Bermuda, as a result. These appearances marked what are to date his final List A appearances for Denmark. Having played a total of 23 matches in that format for his country, Hansen has in the process, taken 33 wickets at a bowling average of 21.30, while with the bat he scored 270 runs at a batting average of 22.50.

Outside of cricket, he works as a banker for Danske Bank in Copenhagen. He also plays his club cricket for Svanholm Cricket Club.

References

External links
Thomas Hansen at ESPNcricinfo
Thomas Hansen at CricketArchive

1976 births
Living people
People from Glostrup Municipality
Danish cricketers
Hampshire cricketers
Danish bankers